The 1903–04 Northern Football League season was the fifteenth in the history of the Northern Football League, a football competition in Northern England.

Clubs

The league featured 13 clubs which competed in the last season, no new clubs joined the league this season.

League table

References

1903-04
1903–04 in English association football leagues